The Princeton Club is a pair of historic buildings located at 1221 and 1223 Locust Street, Philadelphia, Pennsylvania. The building at 1223 was designed by architect Frank Furness; the building at 1221 is believed to have been partly designed by architect Lindley Johnson. From about 1910 through the 1970s, the buildings housed the Princeton Club of Philadelphia. Alterations were made by the club in 1915 and 1919 to join the buildings together.

The Princeton Club of Philadelphia was founded in 1868, and was housed in five other buildings before moving to Locust Street.  According to its 1912 Yearbook, the club served  "to foster good fellowship among Princeton men; and also to provide a suitable place for Alumni meetings, smokers, etc."

The restaurant Deux Cheminées occupied the buildings from 1988 to 2007. The property is currently occupied by the restaurant Vedge.

See also
 National Register of Historic Places listings in Center City, Philadelphia

References

External links
 [ NRHP photo]

Clubhouses on the National Register of Historic Places in Philadelphia
Colonial Revival architecture in Pennsylvania
Gothic Revival architecture in Pennsylvania
Houses completed in 1891
Frank Furness buildings
Washington Square West, Philadelphia